is a Japanese comedy manga series by Hijiki Isoflavone. It has been serialized in Ichijinsha's josei manga magazine Monthly Comic Zero Sum since December 2017 and has been collected in six tankōbon volumes. The manga is licensed in North America by Kodansha USA. An anime television series adaptation by Studio Gokumi aired from July to September 2022.

Plot 
Yuya Niyodo is an idol who debuted as one to earn easy money. When his manager is about to fire him for being unmotivated, he meets the popular idol who died roughly one year ago, Asahi Mogami. Asahi is still lingering around the living world because she loves being an idol so much. The two make an agreement where Asahi will possess Yuya during his idol activities. The story of human who does not want to be an idol and ghost who is dying to become an idol again begins.

Characters

Main 

Yuya is a member of idol unit ZINGS. However, since he debuted as an idol to earn easy money, he is unmotivated in idol performance or fan services. He lets Asahi possess his body during his idol activity so Asahi can stay in the living world as long as possible, and he can keep earning easy money.

A popular idol who lost her life in a car accident roughly a year before her encounter with Yuya.

An idol and member of ZINGS who desperately keeps Yuya in the unit because he cannot perform alone.

Others 

The manager of ZINGS and owner of the company they belong to.

A dedicated Niyodo fan with green hair who often wears a headband with lightsticks attached to it.

A Niyodo fan who works an office job.

A Niyodo fan who is also a student.

The leader of popular idol group Cgrass.

A member of popular idol group Cgrass.

A member of popular idol group Cgrass.

A member of popular idol group Cgrass.

A member of popular idol group Cgrass.

Media

Manga
Phantom of the Idol is written and illustrated by Hijiki Isoflavone. The series began serialization in Ichijinsha's Monthly Comic Zero Sum magazine on December 28, 2017. The manga is licensed in North America by Kodansha USA.

Anime
An anime television series adaptation was announced on November 26, 2021. It was produced by Studio Gokumi and directed by Daisei Fukuoka, with scripts written by Yasuko Aoki, character designs handled by Saori Hosoda, and music composed by myu. It aired from July 2 to September 3, 2022, on TV Tokyo, BS11, and AT-X. The opening theme song is "Let's Zing!", while the ending theme song is "Kimikira", both performed by the musical unit ZINGS, composed of Fumiya Imai and Shun Horie. Sentai Filmworks has licensed the series.

Reception
In 2019, Phantom of the Idol placed third in the 5th Next Manga Award in the print category.

Notes

References

External links
  
  
 

2022 anime television series debuts
Anime series based on manga
Comedy anime and manga
Ichijinsha manga
Japanese idols in anime and manga
Josei manga
Sentai Filmworks
Studio Gokumi
Supernatural anime and manga